FC Spumante Cricova was a Moldovan football club based in Cricova, Moldova. Club was founded in 1994 and played 2 seasons in Moldovan National Division, before it was dissolved.

References

External links
 Spumante Cricova at WeltFussballArchive 

Football clubs in Moldova
Defunct football clubs in Moldova
Association football clubs established in 1994
Association football clubs disestablished in 1997
1994 establishments in Moldova
1997 disestablishments in Moldova